Anaïs Morichon (born 6 October 1999) is a French racing cyclist, who currently rides for French team Arkea. 
Morichon was a member of the  team from 2017 to its first UCI season in 2019.

Cyclo-cross 
2014-2015
 2nd French Cup cadet
2015-2016
3rd  French Cup juniors
 2020-2021
 GP  Topoľčianky
 2021-2022
 Cyclo-cross international Dijon
  Spanish cup #2, Laudio 
 2nd  French Cup

 2022-2023
 Cyclo-cross d'Auxerre
 winner French Cup
 French Cup #3, Camors
 French Cup #4, Camors
 French Cup #6, Troyes

Road race 

 2018
 2nd of the 2nd stage of the La Deux-Sévrienne

 2021
 2nd of the Mirabelle Classic
 3rd of championship Centre-Val de Loire
 3rd of championnat de France sur route espoirs
 3rd overall Tour de Charente-Maritime
 3rd of the 2nd stage of Tour de Charente-Maritime

Big race

Tour de France 
 2022: out of time 7 stage  of Tour de France Femmes 2022

References

External links
 

1999 births
Living people
French female cyclists
Cyclo-cross cyclists
Sportspeople from Limoges
Cyclists from Nouvelle-Aquitaine
20th-century French women
21st-century French women